Faridabad Model School is a school in Faridabad, Haryana, India.

The school is  located in Sector-31, Faridabad adjacent to National Highway 2 (Delhi–Mathura Road). Faridabad Model School is affiliated to Central Board of Secondary Education, New Delhi up to Class XII.

MOTTO of Faridabad Model School

"A child. We at fms help our children to lead a enriching and purposeful life that is grounded on values of Honesty, Integrity, Care and Commitment to serve humanity"

See also
Education in India
Literacy in India  
Amity International School, Gurgaon
List of institutions of higher education in Haryana

References

External links
https://www.fmsschools.com/history

Schools in Faridabad